Sphenocentrum is a monotypic genus of flowering plants belonging to the family Menispermaceae. The only species is Sphenocentrum jollyanum.

Its native range is Western Tropical Africa to Nigeria.

References

Menispermaceae
Menispermaceae genera
Monotypic Ranunculales genera